Holbrook was a train station in Holbrook, Arizona, United States, formerly served by the trains of the Atchison, Topeka and Santa Fe Railway prior to the creation of Amtrak in 1971.

History 

The Atlantic and Pacific Railroad laid tracks through Holbrook in 1881.  This station, built in 1892, replaced the earlier station.  As traffic grew, additions were made in 1907 and 1912. Santa Fe continued to serve this station with the Grand Canyon until the discontinuance of that train in 1971.

The station was restored in 2006.

After Geromino's surrender, some of his people were brought from Fort Apache to Holbrook's station where they boarded a train for Florida  (Navajo County Historical Society records. Geromino, after his capture was taken to Fort Bowie and put on a train to Florida from the Bowie Station. August 2016)

References

External links
 Flickr Photos
 ATSF Holbrook, Arizona depot (Surviving Santa Fe Depots)

Atchison, Topeka and Santa Fe Railway stations in Arizona
Holbrook, Arizona
Buildings and structures in Navajo County, Arizona
Former railway stations in Arizona
Transportation in Navajo County, Arizona
Railway stations in the United States opened in 1892
Railway stations closed in 1984
1892 establishments in Arizona Territory
1984 disestablishments in Arizona